Biagini is an Italian surname. Notable people with the surname include:

 Eugenio Biagini (born 1958), Italian historian
 Francesca Biagini (born 1973), Italian-German mathematician
 Greg Biagini (1952–2003), American player, coach and manager in minor league baseball
 Isabella Biagini (1943–2018), Italian actress and showgirl
 Joe Biagini (born 1990), American professional baseball pitcher
 Luca Biagini (born 1949), Italian actor and voice actor
 Leonardo Biagini (born 1977), Argentine retired footballer  
 

Italian-language surnames